Getawarayo is a 1964 Sri Lankan drama film co-directed by Mike Wilson and Tissa Liyanasuriya and produced by Shesha Palihakkara. The film starring Gamini Fonseka in lead role along with Sobani Amarasinghe, Joe Abeywickrema, Jeevarani Kurukulasuriya and Tony Ranasinghe made supportive roles.

Screened on February 24, 1964, the film was a critically acclaimed production and a blockbuster. The movie won the Best Director and Best Film awards at the 1965 Sarasaviya Film Festival.

Plot 
A village fisherman Jayasena Fernando (Gamini Fonseka) acquires a job in the city at the company where his friend Semanaris (Joe Abeywickrama) works. As Jaya becomes successful he draws the ire of rich boatsman Lalith Hettiarachchi (Carl Gunasena) and the interest of his boss's daughter Surangani (Nilmini De Silva). Jaya gradually forgets about his former girlfriend Karuna (Sobini Amarasinghe) after a misunderstanding with her brother(Vincent Vaas) and begins vying for Sue's attention. In the end Jaya realizes that Sue doesn't matter to him and that he loves Karuna. He decides to go back home after beating Lalith in a motor boat race. Karuna however has married when Jaya returns and the film ends with him contemplating his future to the strains of Amaradeva's voice.

Tony Ranasinghe plays a newspaper reporter who is sympathetic to Jaya.

Cast
 Gamini Fonseka as Jayasena 'Jaya' Fernando
 Joe Abeywickrama as Semaneris
 Sobani Amarasinghe as Karuna
 Karl Gunasena as Lalith Hettiarachchi
 Nilmini de Silva as Suranganie 'Sue' Frederick
 Vincent Vaas as Bandusena
 Tony Ranasinghe as Mr. Ilangakoon
 Paul Ekman as Paul Ekman
 Hector Ekanayake as Douglas 'Dougie' Ekanayake
 Thilakasiri Fernando as Jaya's Thaththa
 Douglas Wickremasinghe as Mr. Frederick
 Lakshmi Bai as Maldeniya Hamine 'Hani Hamy'
 Devika Karunaratne as Jaya's sister
 Bandu Munasinghe as Boxer
 M. A. Simeon as Semaneris' derisive co-worker
 Pujitha Mendis as Bucket hat actor ("Etha Gaw Ganan")
 Austin Abeysekara as Store Mudalali
 Dayananda Jayawardena as Bar visitor
 Donald Karunaratna as Dancer ("Etha Gaw Ganan")

Production 
The movie was Sesha Palihakkara's second production. Gamini Fonseka was chosen to star in the film as he was becoming a major star at the time. It was first screened on February 26, 1964.

Soundtrack 
W.D. Amaradeva composed the majority of the movie's music. "Etha Gaw Ganan Durin" was sung by Narada Disasekara with lyrics by Mahagama Sekera and music by Amaradeva. Amaradeva composed and sang "Swarna Vimanaya" with lyrics by Madawela S. Ratnayake.

References

External links
 National Film Corporation of Sri Lanka - Official Website
 
 Sri Lanka Cinema Database

1966 films
1966 drama films
1960s Sinhala-language films
Sri Lankan drama films